The study of Geography of disability is a multi-disciplinary branch of human geography studying the experiences of people with a disability in the context of geography. Its study considers issues of accessibility, mobility and the landscape of socioeconomic, environmental and political perspectives. 

According to the World Health Organization, about 15% of the world's population lives with some form of disability, of which 2-4% experiences significant difficulties in functioning. In Europe and America, the disability ratio is one in five people. The WHO report indicated that a person's socio-economic environment can affect their risk of non-congenital disability. These considerations observe coincident phenomena including poverty, government investment in medical services, and individual access to healthcare. Inadequate infrastructure and investment can worsen their condition. 

In Australia, a research on disability conducted by the Australian Institute of Health and Welfare found a strong positive correlation between location in economically disadvantaged areas, and the probability of disability, whether mild or severe.

This correlation is also seen in the United States. In the US, according to the Disability Statistics Annual Report, distribution of people with disabilities aged ranges from 18 to 64 is concentrated in the Southeast United States, including Georgia, Tennessee, Louisiana and Arkansas etc. The theory that lower socioeconomic values and heightened disability risk correlate is supported on the face of it when considering the aforementioned regions are the most economically disadvantaged areas in the United States.

Another example providing supporting data is Memphis, Tennessee, a city with a high poverty rate of 26.2% It is also one of the US cities with the densest population of disabled people. A reported 12.6% - 17.8% of its working population (aged from 18 to 64) live with some form of disability. The figures also indicated that females were at greater risk of having a disability than males regardless of their age. According to the Eurostat, in Europe, women are 3% more prone to have a longstanding health problem and daily activity difficulties than men in 2011.

History 

Since the 1930s, the Geography scholars have recognized issues with disabilities. The research has extended to a range of socio-spatial processes relating to disabilities that interacts among power, space and society. There were some analyses of disabilities within the socio-spatial perspectives. However, these analyses tended to isolate from each other instead of integrating all ideas together as a critical discourse. It also changed the definition of disability from a medical point of view, towards the socio-spatial determinants.

Imrie explained the recent development in The Geographies of Disability: "An opening observation is that what has emerged, since the mid-1990s, has been a broadening of the substantive focus of studies of space and disability. Beyond some of the earlier foci of health, cognition and behavior, welfare, design, and architecture. In particular, the study of disability is evident in most parts of human geography, and not just confined to a specialist or sub-part of the discipline.

The narratives and discursive practices suggested by Hawkesworth also emerged in the geography of disability studies. 

The interrelationships between the body, the feeling of a place and disability, suggested by Imrie, lead to a wider and deeper scope and the focus of the studies especially regarding to different age groups with different extent and types of disability.

Socio-economic issues 

The logic of disability oppression closely parallels the oppression of other groups. It is a logic bound up with political-economic needs and belief systems of domination.

The models of disability 

The medical model of disability considers it as the physical problem, the incapability of a disabled person to perform activities of daily living as 'normal' as a person that has no disability. Studying disability under the medical model focuses easing the inconvenience and improving a person with disabilities' daily experience, such as introducing advanced assistive devices or mobility aids like wheelchairs for disabled individuals who live on their own.

On the other hand, the social model of disability evokes the idea of social integration through demonstrating the difficulties faced by disabled people in the wake of their physical or mental functioning differences. The social model of disability encourages the mainstream social and cultural structure to accommodate disabled individuals with more assistive infrastructure and improved social attitudes.

Children and teenagers who have learning difficulties are more likely to experience discrimination, such as getting rejected by mainstream schools. The young disabled population aged 15–24 are 10 times more prone to receiving discrimination than the elder disabled population aged 65 and over.

Rob Imrie and Claire Edwards further described in their article of how the geographical research methodology is carried out for the social research on disabled people.

"Hall and Kearns (2001: 243), for example, comment that 'traditional' research methods, such as questionnaires and interviews, 'can fail to represent the geographical lives of intellectually disabled people' (also, see Hall, 2004). Similarly, a project by Kitchin (2000), about the opinions of disabled people about social research, shows that most do not like the use of methods that fail to capture the complexities of disability. Such methods include pre-set questions that collect quantitative data and statistics. These observations suggest that the use of particular qualitative or interpretative methods are a preferred way of giving voice to disabled people's experiences, and open up scope for inclusive research practices. In this respect, there have been some important methodological developments in geographical research that seek to articulate the different ways that disabled people know and experience the world."

Environmental politics of disability

The environmental politics of disability 
A disabled person's origin and living environment, including the mobility, accessibility, space and living conditions, greatly determines and impact their daily experience as well as their physical and mental conditions.

Accessible tourism 
The concept of accessible tourism is one of the significant developments derived from the development of the geography of disability. The idea behind the accessible tourism is to strive for a basic human right for those with disabilities to participate in tourism, and to promote the best accessibility practices in tourism by engaging representatives of international tourism sector as well as the representatives of disabled individuals and also non-governmental parties to cooperate.

In the wake of the development of disability research, along with the awareness of the need of tourists, the concept and the idea of accessible tourism which aim to promote 'tourism without barriers' has gradually drawn people's attention as well as the World Tourism Organization's publication. UNWTO  has since published a range of information including Manuals on Accessible Tourism for tourism stakeholders to ensure the quality and quantity of the supply of good accessible tourism practices, and recommendations on Accessible Tourism for people with disabilities.

The research results of the geography of disability intrigue a further studies of universe design of space in relation to the mobility and accessibility, and the improvement of the assistive technologies to confront the barriers encountered by those with disabilities. The geographical model of disability was created during research of the geography of disability.

Zajadacz stated that: "In recent years, geographers have made significant strides towards understanding the spatially of disability. This research has presented disability as a characteristic of the population that inevitably leads to marginalization and spatial exclusion from otherwise normal social arenas and spaces within the built environment. Geographers claimed that throughout the research on the geography of disability, they connected the cause of disability in terms of social and spatial environment and helped the promotion of more accommodating resolution which "provide access to sites and the full scope of life within society taking different degrees and types of disability into consideration."

Discrimination in law and policy 
Due to the discrimination and injustice that the disabled community has experienced. In some countries, lawmakers have taken steps to create policies that protect this large portion of the population. 

The WHO's report about the disabling barriers mentions:"Beliefs and prejudices constitute barriers to education, employment, health care, and social participation. For example, the attitudes of teachers, school administrators, other children, and even family members affect the inclusion of children with disabilities in mainstream schools. Misconceptions by employers that people with disabilities are less productive than their non-disabled counterparts, and ignorance about available adjustments to work arrangements limits employment opportunities."In Australia, The Disability Discrimination Act 1992 (DDA) prohibits any direct or indirect discrimination towards a person, either temporarily or permanently disabled, or with the future potential of being disabled, in areas including employment, education, access to services and public places and rights to purchase premises.

References 

Disability
Human geography
Physical geography